Attorney General Finlay may refer to:

John Findlay (New Zealand politician) (1862–1929), Attorney-General of New Zealand
Martyn Finlay (1912–1999), Attorney-General of New Zealand
Robert Finlay, 1st Viscount Finlay (1842–1929), Attorney General for England and Wales